Hyperoxaluria is an excessive urinary excretion of oxalate. Individuals with hyperoxaluria often have calcium oxalate kidney stones.  It is sometimes called Bird's disease, after Golding Bird, who first described the condition.

Causes
Hyperoxaluria can be primary (as a result of a genetic defect) or secondary to another disease process.

Type I primary hyperoxaluria (PH1) is associated mutations in the gene encoding AGXT, a key enzyme involved in oxalate metabolism. PH1 is an example of a protein mistargeting disease, wherein AGXT shows a trafficking defect. Instead of being trafficked to peroxisomes, it is targeted to mitochondria, where it is metabolically deficient despite being catalytically active. Type II is associated with GRHPR.

Secondary hyperoxaluria can occur as a complication of jejunoileal bypass, or in a patient who has lost much of the ileum with an intact colon. In these cases, hyperoxaluria is caused by excessive gastrointestinal oxalate absorption.

Excessive intake of oxalate-containing food, such as rhubarb, may also be a cause in rare cases.

Diagnosis

Types
 Primary hyperoxaluria
 Enteric hyperoxaluria
 Idiopathic hyperoxaluria
 Oxalate poisoning

Treatment
The main therapeutic approach to primary hyperoxaluria is still restricted to symptomatic treatment, i.e. kidney transplantation once the disease has already reached mature or terminal stages. However, through genomics and proteomics approaches, efforts are currently being made to elucidate the kinetics of AGXT folding which has a direct bearing on its targeting to appropriate subcellular localization. Secondary hyperoxaluria is much more common than primary hyperoxaluria, and should be treated by limiting dietary oxalate and providing calcium supplementation. A child with primary hyperoxaluria was treated with a liver and kidney transplant. A favorable outcome is more likely if a kidney transplant is complemented by a liver transplant, given the disease originates in the liver.

Controversy

Perhaps the key difficulty in understanding pathogenesis of primary hyperoxaluria, or more specifically, why AGXT ends up in mitochondria instead of peroxisomes, stems from AGXT's somewhat peculiar evolution. Namely, prior to its current peroxysomal 'destiny', AGXT indeed used to be bound to mitochondria. AGXT's peroxisomal targeting sequence is uniquely specific for mammalian species, suggesting the presence of additional peroxisomal targeting information elsewhere in the AGT molecule. As AGXT was redirected to peroxisomes over the course of evolution, it is plausible  that its current aberrant localization to mitochondria owes to some hidden molecular signature in AGXT's spatial configuration unmasked by PH1 mutations affecting the AGXT gene.

References

External links 

  GeneReviews/NIH/NCBI/UW entry on Primary Hyperoxaluria Type 1

Abnormal clinical and laboratory findings for urine
Inborn errors of carbohydrate metabolism